Phoracanthini is a tribe of beetles in the subfamily Cerambycinae, containing twelve genus: Coptocercus, Allotisis, Thoris, Epithora, Skeletodes, Atesta, Paratesta, Steata, Coleocoptus, Phytrocaria, Phoracantha and Semiphoracantha:

References

 
Cerambycinae